Broumas is a surname. Notable people with the surname include: 

Jamie Broumas (born 1959), American jazz singer and arts administrator
Olga Broumas (born 1949), Greek poet